Lyudmil Tonchev (born 22 June 1958) is a Bulgarian alpine skier. He competed in two events at the 1980 Winter Olympics.

References

External links
 

1958 births
Living people
Bulgarian male alpine skiers
Olympic alpine skiers of Bulgaria
Alpine skiers at the 1980 Winter Olympics
People from Samokov
Sportspeople from Sofia Province